Tony Dupé is an Australian music producer and musician. He performs and releases music under the name of Saddleback. He has released two solo albums, Everything's a Love Letter and Night Maps. Known for his work with Holly Throsby, who he produced three albums for, Dupé has also worked with Grand Salvo, Piers Twomey, Jamie Hutchings, Bluebottle Kiss, Jack Ladder, SeaLifePark, Glovebox, Fergus Brown, The Woods, Grand Salvo, and many others. Dupé recently composed the score to the ABC animated series The Gradual Demise of Phillipa Finch.

Until recently, Tony Dupé completed much of his recording work in a studio based on a rural property in the NSW Southern Highlands. The studio was a weatherboard cottage on located on Saddleback Mountain. He is now based in Melbourne after working in Berlin for a number of years.

Discography
Everything's a Love Letter 2004 - Preservation/Inertia 
Night Maps 2007 - Preservation

References

Year of birth missing (living people)
Living people
Australian record producers
Australian composers